Siua Taumalolo (born 8 July 1976 in Nukualofa, Tonga) was a rugby union player for Bristol in the Guinness Premiership.

Commonly referred to as Josh, he spent several years in Welsh rugby, playing for Ebbw Vale RFC before joining Bridgend RFC in 2000.  He was a member of the Bridgend team which won the final Welsh Premier Division before the restructuring of Welsh rugby in 2003.

After this restructuring, Taumololo played for Harlequins for a year, and following their relegation, moved to Sale Sharks before returning to play in the now semi-professional Welsh Premier Division with Neath RFC.

He signed for Bristol from Neath in the Summer of 2006 on a one-year contract but was renewed after assured performances.

He is a Tongan international and has also toured with the Pacific Islanders rugby union team in 2006–2007.

He has signed a contract with FC Grenoble in the French Pro D2 for the 2008–2009 season.

References

External links

Bristol Rugby profile

1976 births
Living people
Bristol Bears players
Tonga international rugby union players
Tongan rugby union players
Sale Sharks players
Harlequin F.C. players
Tongan expatriate rugby union players
Expatriate rugby union players in Wales
Expatriate rugby union players in England
Tongan expatriate sportspeople in Wales
Tongan expatriate sportspeople in England
People from Nukuʻalofa
Rugby union centres